Howard Marion-Crawford (17 January 1914 – 24 November 1969), the grandson of writer F. Marion Crawford, was an English character actor, best known for his portrayal of Dr. Watson in the 1954 television adaptation of Sherlock Holmes. In 1948, Marion-Crawford had played Holmes in a radio adaptation of "The Adventure of the Speckled Band", making him one of the few actors to portray both Holmes and Watson. He is also known for his portrayal of Dr. Petrie in a series of five low budget Dr. Fu Manchu films in the 1960s, and playing Paul Temple in the BBC Radio serialisations.

Career
Howard Marion-Crawford was the son of an officer of the Irish Guards killed during the First World War. After attending Clifton College Crawford attended RADA and began a career in radio. His first film appearance was in Brown on Resolution (1935). During the Second World War he enlisted in the Irish Guards, his father's old regiment, but soon suffered a major injury to one of his legs that caused him to be invalided out of the service. After he recovered, he enlisted in the Royal Air Force, where he became a navigator, and rose to the rank of sergeant.

He resumed his acting career in both film in The Rake's Progress (1945) and was a regular broadcaster in BBC Radio Drama including playing the fictional detective Paul Temple in several series by Francis Durbridge. Among his film appearances are the character of Cranford in The Man in the White Suit (1951) and a British medical officer in Lawrence of Arabia (1962). One of his last roles was as another military officer, Sir George Brown, in Tony Richardson's The Charge of the Light Brigade (1968).

He often played "blusterers", "old duffers" and upper class military types, appearing as guest performer in television programmes like The Avengers, The Saint, and three roles with Patrick McGoohan in the television series Danger Man: the 1964 episodes "No Marks for Servility" and "Yesterday's Enemies" and the 1965 episode "English Lady Takes Lodgers". In 1956, he starred in "Fallstaff's Fur Coat" on Adventure Theater.

Personal life

Marion-Crawford was married four times. Early in the Second World War, he was married to Jeanne Scott-Gunn, with whom he had a single son, Harold Francis Marion-Crawford. In 1946, he married the actress Mary Wimbush, with whom he had another son, Charles. His later marriages were to June Elliot and Germaine Tighe-Umbers.

A large man with a very distinctive booming voice, known to his friends and family as "Boney", Howard Marion-Crawford had a lot of talent and acting came easily to him. Unfortunately, this sometimes led to his being unreliable and his later years were a struggle. Plagued by ill health later in life, he died from a mixture of alcohol and sleeping pills in 1969. An inquest recorded accidental death, his doctor stating that "in moments of strife he would go on a drinking bout lasting twenty-four to forty-eight hours".

Selected filmography

 Me and Marlborough (1935) - Minor Role (uncredited)
 The Guv'nor (1935) - Undetermined Role (uncredited)
 Brown on Resolution (1935) - Max
 Music Hath Charms (1935) - (uncredited)
 Secret Agent (1936) - Karl - Lilli's Fiancé (uncredited)
 13 Men and a Gun (1938) - Kramer
 The Spy in Black (1939) - German Officer in Kieler Hof Hotel (uncredited)
 Night Train to Munich (1940) - SS Officer Checking Passes (uncredited)
 Freedom Radio (1941) - Kummer
 The Rake's Progress (1945) - Coldstream Guardsman (uncredited)
 The Phantom Shot (1947) - Sgt. Clapper
 Man on the Run (1949) - 1st Paratrooper 
 The Hasty Heart (1949) - Tommy
 Stage Fright (1950) - 1st Chauffeur (uncredited)
 Mister Drake's Duck (1951) - Maj. Travers
 The Man in the White Suit (1951) - Cranford
 His Excellency (1952) - Tea Shop Proprietor
 Where's Charley? (1953) - Sir Francis Chesney
 Top of the Form (1953) - Dickson
 Knights of the Round Table (1953) - Simon (uncredited)
 Don't Blame the Stork (1954) - Fluffy Faversham
 West of Zanzibar (1954) - Wood
 The Rainbow Jacket (1954) - Travers 
 Five Days (1954) - Cyrus McGowan 
 Othello (1956) - Othello (English version, voice)
 Reach for the Sky (1956) - Woody' Woodhall
 War and Peace (1956) - Prince Bolkonsky (voice, uncredited)
 The Silken Affair (1956) - Baggott
 The Man in the Sky (1957) - Ingrams
 Ill Met by Moonlight (1957) - British Port Officer (uncredited)
 Don Quixote (1957) - Sancho Panza (English version, voice, uncredited)
 The Birthday Present (1957) - George Bates
 The Silent Enemy (1958) - Wing Commander
 Gideon's Day (1958) - The Chief
 Next to No Time (1958) - Hobbs
 Virgin Island (US: Our Virgin Island, 1958) - Prescott
 Nowhere to Go (US: Our Virgin Island, 1958) - Mack Cameron (uncredited)
 Model for Murder (1959) - Inspector Duncan
 Life in Danger (1959) - Major Peters
 North West Frontier (1959) - Peter's Contact at Kalapur Station (uncredited)
 Foxhole in Cairo (1960) - British Major
 Carry On Regardless (1961) - Wine-Tasting Organiser
 The Longest Day (1962) - Glider Doctor (uncredited)
 Lawrence of Arabia (1962) - Medical Officer
 Tamahine (1963) - Major Spruce
 Man in the Middle (1963) - Maj. Poole
 The Face of Fu Manchu (1965) - Doctor Petrie
 Secrets of a Windmill Girl (1966) - Richard - Producer
 The Brides of Fu Manchu (1966) - Doctor Petrie 
 The Vengeance of Fu Manchu (1967) - Doctor Petrie 
 Smashing Time (1967) - Hall Porter (uncredited)
 The Charge of the Light Brigade (1968) - Lt. Gen. Sir George Brown
 The Blood of Fu Manchu (1968) - Doctor Petrie
 The Castle of Fu Manchu (1969) - Doctor Petrie
 Avalanche (1969) - (final film role)

References

External links
Detailed biography of Howard Marion-Crawford

1914 births
1969 deaths
Alcohol-related deaths in England
English male film actors
English male television actors
Irish Guards soldiers
20th-century English male actors
British Army personnel of World War II
Royal Air Force personnel of World War II
Royal Air Force airmen